Lartetotherium is an extinct species of rhinoceros that lived during the Miocene in Europe.

 
The species Lartetotherium sansaniense was a unique cursorial rhinoceros with a distinctly long horn. Its teeth were brachyodont, indicating its diet contained a high quantity of soft plants and a lower proportion of woody material.

References

Miocene rhinoceroses
Miocene mammals of Europe